George Gainer is an American politician who has served as a Republican member of the Florida Senate since 2016. He represents the 2nd district, encompassing Bay, Holmes, Jackson, Walton, Washington, and part of Okaloosa Counties, in the Florida Panhandle. He previously served as a Bay County commissioner, representing Tyndall AFB and other parts of southern Bay County, from 1968 to 1972 and 2002 to 2016.

History
Gainer was born in Jackson County and attended Gulf Coast Community College. His career in the automobile business began in 1966 and he is currently owner of Bay Lincoln Mercury Dodge Hyundai, Bay Suzuki, and Bay Ford in Blountstown. He is a member of the Panama City New Car Dealers Association and past officer of the Chrysler and Ford Dealer and Advertising Councils. In 1968, at age 24, he became the youngest person elected to the Bay County Commission. Gainer then took time off to develop his businesses, and returned to the commission in 2002.

Florida Senate
On September 8, 2015, Gainer announced his campaign for a Florida Senate district being vacated by Don Gaetz, who was term-limited. Gaetz's son Matt Gaetz was in the race for the seat too, but withdrew on March 21, 2016, to run for Florida's 1st congressional district after Congressman Jeff Miller announced his retirement. Gainer was elected in 2016 without primary or general election opposition. On February 21, 2017, Senator Gainer filed SB1096, "Prohibiting a person from obstructing or interfering with traffic during a certain protest or demonstration; providing criminal penalties; exempting a motor vehicle operator from liability for injury or death to a person who is obstructing or interfering with traffic under certain circumstances".

References

George Gainer Pursuing Florida's Senate Seat 

Matt Gaetz launches bid for congress

External links
Bay County Commissioner Bio 

American automobile salespeople
Living people
Republican Party Florida state senators
County commissioners in Florida
People from Bay County, Florida
21st-century American politicians
1942 births